Air India Flight or Air India Crash or variants may refer to:

Air India

 Air India Flight 245, 3 November 1950 crash into Mont Blanc in France
 Air India Flight 101, 24 January 1966 crash into Mont Blanc in France
 Air India Flight 855, 1 January 1978 crash into the Arabian Sea, near India
 Air India Flight 403, 21 June 1982 crash at Bombay, India
 Air India Flight 182, 23 June 1985 mid-air bombing near Ireland, over the Atlantic
 Air India Flight 829, 4 September 2009 runway fire

Air India Express

 Air India Express Flight 812, 22 May 2010 aircrash at Mangalore, India
 Air India Express Flight 1344, 7 August 2020 aircrash at Kozhikode, India

Indian Airlines

 Indian Airlines Flight 814, 24 December 1999 hijacking
 Indian Airlines Flight 491, 26 April 1993 crash at Aurangabad, India
 Indian Airlines Flight 113, 19 October 1988 crash at Ahmedabad, India

Flight number disambiguation pages